Ebba Andersson (1 December 1935 – 19 February 2021) was a Swedish women's footballer who captained the national team.

References

1935 births
2021 deaths
Swedish women's footballers
Sweden women's international footballers
Öxabäcks IF players
Place of birth missing
Place of death missing
Women's association footballers not categorized by position